Lyn Robyn Griffiths  is an Australian academic who serves as Distinguished Professor of molecular genetics at Queensland University of Technology, where she is director of the Centre for Genomics and Personalised Health, the Genomics Research Centre and the BridgeTech Programs. Griffiths is internationally renowned for her work in the discovery the genetics of migraine headaches.

Career
Griffiths graduated with a Bachelor's degree in science in 1978 from the University of New South Wales. After subsequently completing her honours degree, she was awarded an NHMRC Biomedical Postgraduate Scholarship to undertake her PhD at the Sydney University. She went on to spend time as a post-doctoral researcher at the University of Sydney, before moving to Griffith University on the Gold Coast, Queensland. There, she worked her way up to become Professor and Dean of Research (Griffith Health) and Director of the Griffith Health Institute (now called Menzies Health Institute Queensland). In 2013, she relocated her laboratory to the Institute of Health and Biomedical Innovation at Queensland University of Technology, where she took up the role of Executive Director. When the Institute was disbanded in 2020, she was appointed to the position of Inaugural Director of QUT's Centre of Genomics and Personalised Health.

Research
Prof Griffiths’ research has led to diagnostic breakthroughs for several neurogenetic disorders, including familial migraine, ataxia, epilepsy and hereditary stroke. Her research has appeared in more than 400 peer-reviewed international journals, including Nature, the American Journal of Human Genetics, and Nature Neurology.

Publications

Journal articles

Google Scholar lists over 500 documents by Griffiths, which have been cited in excess of 16,000 times, and calculates her h-index as 67.

Book Chapters
 Morris, B. J. & Griffiths, L. R. (1999). Chapter 1: Genes for essential hypertension: the first decade of research. In P. M. Frossard (Ed.), Genetic, Immune and Molecular Predisposition to Hypertension. (pp. 1–45). Utrecht, Netherlands: VSP.
 Carless, M. A., Ashton, K. J., & Griffiths, L. R. (2006). Chapter 6: Cytogenetics of basal cell carcinoma and squamous cell carcinomas. In J. Reichrath (Ed.), Molecular Mechanisms of Basal Cell and Squamous Cell Carcinomas. (p49-57). New York, USA: Springer. .
 Colson, N. J., Lea, R. A., Fernandez, F., & Griffiths, L. R. (2007). Chapter 1: The genetics of migraine. In L. B. Clarke (Ed.), Migraine Disorders Research Trends. (pp. 5–34). New York, USA: Nova Science Publishers. .
 Carless, M. A. & Griffiths, L. R. (2009). Cytogenetics of melanoma and nonmelanoma skin cancer. In J. Reichrath (Ed.), Sunlight, Vitamin D and Skin Cancer. (pp. 227–240). New York, USA: Springer. .
 Green, M. R., Camilleri, E., Gandhi, M. K., & Griffiths, L. R. (2009). Genetic susceptibility to complex traits: moving towards informed analysis of whole-genome screens. In A. Matsumoto & M. Nakano (Eds.), The Human Genome: Features, Variations and Genetic Disorders. (pp. 167–180). New York, USA: Nova Science Publishers. 
 Carless, M. A. & Griffiths, L. R. (2011). Cytogenetics of primary skin tumors. In M. J. Murphy (Ed.), Chapter 4: Molecular Diagnostics in Dermatology and Dermatopathology. (pp. 57–72). New York, USA: Springer. .
 Menon, S., & Griffiths, L. R. (2013). Nutraceuticals in migraine treatment. In H. C. Diener (Ed.), Novel Approaches in Migraine Treatment. (pp. 134–145) London, UK: Future Medicine Ltd. .
 Carless M. And Griffiths L. R. (2014). Cytogenetics of melanoma and non-melanoma skin cancer. In Sunlight, Vitamin D and skin-cancer – 2nd Edition. Springer New York.  .
 Gasparini, C. F., Smith, R. A., & Griffiths, L. R. (2016). Chapter 4: Migraine and Glutamate – Modulators of Glutamatergic Signalling as Potential Treatments of Neuropsychiatric Disorders. In Z. M. Pavlovic (Ed.), Modulators of Glutamatergic Signalling as Potential Treatments of Neuropsychiatric Disorders. Nova Science Publishers, Inc. New York.  (ebook).

Service to professional organisations
Distinguished Professor Griffiths has contributed significantly to her profession. She serves as Chair, Board of Censors for Diagnostic Genomics with the Human Genetics Society of Australasia. Additionally she has served on a number of boards to various bodies including the National Heart Foundation of Australia (Queensland Division),

Recognition
1984-1987 	NHMRC Biomedical Postgraduate Scholarship
2001	Most downloaded article for 2001 Year in Molecular Cellular Probes
2003 	Griffith University Commendation for Excellence in Teaching
2004	Centenary Medal Award - Distinguished Service to Education & Medical Research
2004	Gold Coast Honours Award (Education and Medical Research Category)
2005	Australian of the Year, Queensland Finalist
2006	Suncorp Queenslander of the Year Nominee
2006	Smart State – Smart Women Finalist (Research Scientist Category) 
2010	Research Excellence Award for Senior Researcher, Griffith University
2013	Gold Coast Overall Leadership Award International Women’s Day Festival 2013
2014	Finalist, Life Sciences Queensland (LSQ) Industry Excellence Award
2014	Finalist, Life Sciences Outstanding Achievement Award, Women in Technology (WiT)
2014	Greppi Award:  Best International Migraine Paper, 4th European Headache Migraine Trust International Congress (EHMTIC)
2015	Finalist, Life Sciences Outstanding Achievement, Women in Technology (WiT)
2015	Fellow, Queensland Academy of Arts and Sciences
2017	Human Genetics Society of Australasia, Sutherland Lecturer, 2010
2018	Fellow of the National Heart Foundation
2020	Life Sciences Queensland Limited (LSQ) - the Globally Engaging Networking Event (GENE) Awards: Life Sciences QIMR Berghofer Women of Influence Award
2020	Medical Technology Association of Australia: 2020 Outstanding Achievement Award
2023   Appointed Member of the Order of Australia (AM) in the 2023 Australia Day Honours for "significant service to genetics, and to research into neurological disorders".

References

Living people
University of New South Wales alumni
University of Sydney alumni
Geneticists
Human geneticists
Australian geneticists
Academics from Brisbane
Australian medical researchers
Members of the Order of Australia
Year of birth missing (living people)